Syritta hackeri is a species of syrphid fly in the family Syrphidae.

Distribution
Java, Australia.

References

Eristalinae
Diptera of Asia
Diptera of Australasia
Insects described in 1924